Joseph Léo Gérard Gravelle (June 10, 1925 – October 30, 2013) was a Canadian professional ice hockey player who played 223 games in the National Hockey League between 1946 and 1951.  He played with the Detroit Red Wings and Montreal Canadiens.

He died on October 30, 2013, at the age of 88.

Career statistics

Regular season and playoffs

References

External links
 

1925 births
2013 deaths
Brantford Lions players
Buffalo Bisons (AHL) players
Canadian ice hockey right wingers
Chicoutimi Saguenéens (QSHL) players
Detroit Red Wings players
Houston Huskies players
Ice hockey people from Gatineau
Indianapolis Capitals players
Montreal Canadiens players
Montreal Royals (QSHL) players
Ontario Hockey Association Senior A League (1890–1979) players
Ottawa Senators (QSHL) players
Toronto St. Michael's Majors players